The Temple of Faunus (Latin: aedes Fauni) was an ancient Roman temple on the southern end of the Tiber Island in Rome, dedicated to Faunus, the god of flocks. It was the only temple with that dedication in Rome itself.

It was a hexastyle prostyle built in 196 BC by Gnaeus Domitius Ahenobarbus and Gaius Scribonius Libo and financed by a fine they had imposed on the shepherd of a flock which (probably) had accidentally grazed for free on a public field. It was dedicated in 194 BC on the Ides of February, anticipating by two days the major Roman festival of Faunus, the Lupercalia.
If still in use by the 4th-and 5th century, it would have been closed during the persecution of pagans in the late Roman Empire.

See also
List of Ancient Roman temples

Bibliography 
 Lawrence Richardson, Jr., "Fanus, Aedes", in A New Topographical Dictionary of Ancient Rome, JHU, Baltimore 1992, p. 148.

Faunus
Roman temples by deity
2nd-century BC religious buildings and structures